Brochocin may refer to the following places in Poland:
Brochocin, Ząbkowice Śląskie County in Lower Silesian Voivodeship (south-west Poland)
Brochocin, Złotoryja County in Lower Silesian Voivodeship (south-west Poland)
Brochocin, Trzebnica County in Lower Silesian Voivodeship (south-west Poland)
Brochocin, Płock County in Masovian Voivodeship (east-central Poland)
Brochocin, Sochaczew County in Masovian Voivodeship (east-central Poland)